George Burman Foster (1858–1918) was part of the faculty in the Divinity School (Baptist) at the University of Chicago under the leadership of William Rainey Harper. His views were often thought by his contemporaries to support scientific naturalistic and humanistic views that contradict a Baptist view.
A friendship with Clarence Darrow shows that despite Foster's progressive views he still valued and respected the views of a traditional Christian community.

Biography 
George Burman Foster was born in Wolfcreek, Virginia (now West Virginia) on April 2, 1858. He graduated from West Virginia University with an A.M. degree in 1883.

He married Mary Lyon on August 6, 1884, and they had two children.

He died in Chicago on December 22, 1918.

Selected publications 
 The finality of the Christian religion. University of Chicago Press, 1906.
 The function of religion in man's struggle for existence. University of Chicago Press, 1909.
 Christianity in its modern expression. Macmillan, 1921.

References

Further reading 
 Gary J. Dorrien. The making of American liberal theology: idealism, realism, and modernity, 1900–1950. Westminster John Knox Press, 2003. . pp. 156–161.

External links 
Guide to the George Burman Foster Papers 1897-1917 at the University of Chicago Special Collections Research Center 

1858 births
1918 deaths
19th-century Protestant theologians
People from Monroe County, West Virginia
West Virginia University alumni